Shape of the Moon is a Dutch/Indonesian documentary film from 2004 directed by Leonard Retel Helmrich. The documentary released on 24 November 2004 as opening film of IDFA (International Documentary Festival Amsterdam).

The documentary is the continuation of Eye of the Day and follows again the family Sjamsuddin, consisting of three generations living in the slums of Jakarta, Indonesia.

Writers
Leonard Retel Helmrich
Hetty Naaijkens-Retel Helmrich

Awards
VPRO IDFA Award for Best Feature-Length Documentary - Amsterdam International Documentary Film Festival
Sundance World Documentary Award for Best Documentary - Sundance Film Festival
Muhammad Fiaz

External links
 

Dutch documentary films
2004 films
2000s Indonesian-language films
2004 documentary films
Documentary films about families
Sundance Film Festival award winners
Documentary films about Indonesia
Films directed by Leonard Retel Helmrich